Wethersfield Township is one of twenty-four townships in Henry County, Illinois, USA.  As of the 2010 census, its population was 3,935 and contained 1,827 housing units.

Geography

Cities, towns, villages
 Kewanee (southwest quarter)

Extinct towns
 Saxon at 
(These towns are listed as "historical" by the USGS.)
 Wethersfield at

Adjacent townships
 Kewanee Township (north)
 Elmira Township, Stark County (east)
 Toulon Township, Stark County (southeast)
 Goshen Township, Stark County (south)
 Lynn Township, Knox County (southwest)
 Galva Township (west)
 Burns Township (northwest)

Cemeteries
The township contains these four cemeteries: Cavanagh, Evergreen Memory Garden, Saxon and Wethersfield.

Major highways
  U.S. Route 34
  Illinois Route 78

Airports and landing strips
 Kewanee Municipal Airport

Landmarks
 Windmont Park

Demographics

School districts
 Galva Community Unit School District 224
 Stark County Community Unit School District 100
 Wethersfield Community Unit School District 230

Political districts
 Illinois's 17th congressional district
 State House District 74
 State Senate District 37

References
 United States Census Bureau 2008 TIGER/Line Shapefiles
 
 United States National Atlas

External links
 City-Data.com
 Illinois State Archives
 Township Officials of Illinois

Townships in Henry County, Illinois
Townships in Illinois